Klochkov is a rural locality (a khutor) in Pologozaymishchensky Selsoviet of Akhtubinsky District, Astrakhan Oblast, Russia. The population was 12 as of 2010. There is 1 street.

Geography 
Klochkov is located 42 km northwest of Akhtubinsk (the district's administrative centre) by road. Pologoye Zaymishche is the nearest rural locality.

References 

Rural localities in Akhtubinsky District